Asi Es El Amor (That's How Love Is) is a studio album released by the romantic group, Grupo Bryndis. All songs were composed by the group members.

Track listing
"Olvidemos Nuestro Orgullo" (Mauro Posadas) – 3:42 
"Esta Triste Soledad" (Posadas) – 3:40
"Crei Que Me Amabas" (Guadalupe Guevara) – 3:48
"Asi Es el Amor" (Gerardo Izaguirre) – 3:28
"Tuve Que Partir" (Juan Guevara) – 3:58
"Perdoname" (Posadas) – 3:34
"Corazon Destrozado" (Juan Guevara) – 3:51
"Mi Desprecio" (Claudio Pablo Montaño) – 3:51
"Te Extraño" (Juan Guevara) – 3:49
"Siempre Te Amare" (Guadalupe Guevara) – 3:11

Grupo Bryndis albums
1997 albums
Disa Records albums